Burchard de Volder (26 July 1643 – 21 March 1709) was a Dutch physicist.

Biography
He was born in a Mennonite family in Amsterdam. He earned an M.A. in philosophy at the University of Utrecht under  in 1660. He earned his medical doctorate from the University of Leiden under Franciscus Sylvius in 1664. He became professor of physics at Leiden University in 1670. Thanks to the efforts of the Volder, a physics laboratory at the University of Leiden was established in 1675. He collected measuring instruments of all kinds and performed many physics demonstrations, particularly those illustrating the discoveries of Robert Boyle. This laboratory was unique for its time.  He is further famous as one of Gottfried Leibniz's most important philosophical correspondents.

De Volder's work drew many foreign students. One of his most famous students was Herman Boerhaave.

References

External links
 
 Ph.D. students of B. de Volder

1643 births
1709 deaths
17th-century Dutch philosophers
17th-century Dutch mathematicians
Utrecht University alumni
Leiden University alumni
Academic staff of Leiden University
Scientists from Amsterdam